Mary F. Foskett (born 1961) is a Chinese-American New Testament scholar.

Biography 
An ethnic Chinese born in Japan, Foskett was adopted into a white American family. Foskett received her BA from New York University, M.Div. from Union Theological Seminary, New York, and Ph.D. in New Testament and Christian Origins from Emory University. She is presently the Wake Forest Kahle Professor of Religious Studies and Albritton Fellow at Wake Forest University, and has written primarily in contemporary New Testament studies, with a focus on gender and Asian American culture.

Works

References 

1961 births
Living people
American people of Chinese descent
American biblical scholars
New Testament scholars
Emory University alumni
Wake Forest University faculty
Christian feminist biblical scholars
American women non-fiction writers
American women academics
Female biblical scholars